Svånåtindene is a small mountain range in Lesja Municipality in Innlandet county, Norway. The mountains are part of the larger Dovrefjell mountains inside the borders of the Dovrefjell-Sunndalsfjella National Park.

See also
List of mountains of Norway

References

Mountains of Innlandet
Lesja